Lindsey Oil Refinery is an oil refinery in North Killingholme, North Lincolnshire, England owned and operated by the Prax Group. It lies to the north of the Humber Refinery, owned by rival oil company Phillips 66, and the railway line to Immingham Docks. Immingham Power Station, owned by VPI Immingham, provides the electricity and heat for the fractionation processes.

History and operation

The refinery entered service in May 1968 as a joint project between Total and Fina and currently employs a permanent staff of around 415, as well as several hundred contractors on site, rising to up to several thousand during major turnaround and maintenance projects. It is named after the former Lindsey pre-1974 local government area of Lincolnshire. In 1999, Total took full control of the plant, when it bought Fina.

Producing around 35 types of product, it currently processes circa 113,000 barrels of oil per day after its refining capacity was almost halved during restructuring initiatives by former operators Total.

Crude oil is imported via two pipelines, connecting the 1,000-metre jetty five miles away at Immingham Dock, to the refinery.

In March 2021, the refinery was bought by Prax Group from Total S.A.

Production units
In the 1980s, a fluid catalytic cracker, an alkylation unit, a visbreaker, and an MTBE (Methyl tert-butyl ether) unit (for high octane petrol) were added.

In 2007, a distillate hydrotreater (HDS) was built. A hydrogen production unit (a methane steam reformer for the hydrotreater process) is being built, for completion in 2009. The new plant will provide ultra-low sulfur diesel and mean different types of crude oil can be processed, that can be made in a conventional catalytic cracker or hydrocracker. It was built from June 2008 – June 2009 by Jacobs Engineering.

2009 workers dispute

On 28 January 2009, approximately 800 of Lindsey Oil Refinery's local contractors went on strike following the appointment by the Italian construction contractor IREM of several hundred European (mainly Italian and Portuguese) contractors on the site at a time of high unemployment in the local and global economy.

Subsequently, sympathy walkouts at other UK petroleum, power and chemical sites took place. 700 workers were sacked at the plant in June 2009, resulting in further worker walkouts at other UK sites. Negotiations led to the reinstatement of 647 workers at the end of June 2009.

2010 accident

On Tuesday 29 June 2010 an explosion and subsequent fire broke out at the plant, killing Robert Greenacre, a 24-year-old worker, and injuring others. It originated beneath an Atmospheric Distillation Column (CDU-2) at a steam out point where maintenance was being carried out. Total reported that firefighters had found traces of asbestos in the refinery's crude oil distillation unit three days after the initial explosion.

Local impact
The refinery's presence causes a considerable amount of traffic to pass through the village of North Killingholme at the time of work hours commencing and ending. This has caused some disputes with the refinery's neighbouring community.

In December 2004, Total were fined £12,500 for allowing 60,000 litres of crude oil to leak into the Humber Estuary.

References

https://www.business-live.co.uk/manufacturing/lindsey-oil-refinery-deal-completes-19937054 on 1 March 2021
https://www.spglobal.com/platts/en/market-insights/latest-news/oil/030121-prax-group-completes-acquisition-of-uks-lindsey-refinery on 1 March 2021
https://www.rigzone.com/news/prax_group_completes_total_uk_refinery_buy-08-mar-2021-164822-article/ on 8 March 2021

External links

 
 

Oil refineries in the United Kingdom
Buildings and structures in Lincolnshire
Energy infrastructure completed in 1968
Borough of North Lincolnshire
TotalEnergies
2010 fires in the United Kingdom
Fires in England
June 2010 events in the United Kingdom